Ibrahim Imam (1916 – April 1980) was a Kanuri politician from Borno, Nigeria who was the secretary of the Northern People's Congress and later became a patron of the Borno Youth Movement. He was elected into the Northern House of Assembly in 1961, representing a Tiv district. Prior to his election in 1961, he had represented his district of Yerwa in 1951 after supporting a strike of Native Administration workers.

Early life and education
Imam was a Kanuri man from the Yerwa district of Borno. He was born in 1916 into an aristocratic family and his half-brother was the district head of Yerwa.  He attended Katsina College and after completing his studies joined the Borno Native Administration as an assistant and later became the supervisor of works in 1950.

Political career
While working as an engineering assistant for the Borno Native Authority, he entered the political arena as the founder of the Borno Youth Improvement Association in 1949. In 1951, he contested and won a seat to the House of Assembly defeating the Waziri Mohammed. A year later at the inception of the Northern People's Congress, which later became the dominant party in the region, he was nominated as the party's secretary-general; he joined a large number of his colleagues from the regional house who enlisted on the political platform of the new NPC. As the general secretary of NPC, he became one of the party's prominent campaigners  and was involved in political tours, traveling for thousands of miles while providing support for the extension of the party through the establishment of branches in various towns and cities in the region. 

After leaving the Native Authority, he became a building contractor to supplement his income as an honourable member of the House.

Borno Youth Movement
In 1954, however, Imam resigned his position from NPC and left the party, citing the lack of a revolutionary platform for political reform of the local government in the north and also NPC's movement towards a reactionary and imperialistic political union. A year later, he joined Aminu Kano's Northern Elements Progressive Union  and in 1956, he became the patron of the Borno Youth Movement, a young organization that had grown out of its members disappointment with the native authority in Borno and the scandal of the Waziri, Mohammed. In 1956, he encouraged a fruitful alliance of the movement with NEPU particularly in Borno where the alliance later won two regional seats. But in a few years, Imam an ambitious politician was in need of resources to organize the alliance in Bornu and in the Northern region left the merger due to the inability of NEPU to contribute enough resources to strengthen the party in the region. He left NEPU and established an alliance with the Action Group and later became the leader of opposition in the regional House of Assembly.

References

People from Borno State
Borno Youth Movement politicians
Northern People's Congress politicians
1916 births
1980 deaths
20th-century Nigerian politicians
Kanuri people